The Old First Presbyterian Church, also known as First Presbyterian Church and Cemetery, is a church in Newark, Essex County, New Jersey, United States.  The church was listed on the National Register of Historic Places in 1972. The grounds, located in the Four Corners Historic District, includes an old burial ground.

Notable burials
 William Burnet (1730–1791), physician who represented New Jersey in the Continental Congress from 1780 to 1781.
 Silas Condit (1778–1861), represented New Jersey in the United States House of Representatives from 1831 to 1833.
 Thomas Ward (1759–1842), represented New Jersey's 1st congressional district in the United States House of Representatives from 1813 to 1817.
 Thomas M. Woodruff (1804–1855), represented New York's 5th congressional district in the United States House of Representatives from 1845 to 1847.

See also 
 National Register of Historic Places listings in Essex County, New Jersey

References

External links 

 
 First Presbyterian Church Cemetery / Churchyard at The Political Graveyard
 

Churches completed in 1787
Churches on the National Register of Historic Places in New Jersey
Georgian architecture in New Jersey
Cemeteries in Newark, New Jersey
Protestant Reformed cemeteries
Presbyterian churches in New Jersey
Culture of Newark, New Jersey
Churches in Newark, New Jersey
National Register of Historic Places in Newark, New Jersey
1787 establishments in New Jersey
New Jersey Register of Historic Places
18th-century Presbyterian church buildings in the United States
Historic district contributing properties in Newark, New Jersey